Sonaimuri (সোনাইমুড়ী) is a newly established upazila or sub-district in Noakhali District, Bangladesh. It consists of ten union councils or parishads - Ambarnagar, Amisha Para, Bazra, Deoti, Jayag, Nadana, Nateshwar, Sonaimuri, Sonapur and Baragaon. Sonaimuri was declared as an upazila in response to a popular demand in 2005. The area of Sonaimuri is 169.14 km2 while its population is 327,194. People in this upazila is generally solvent and engaged in business and agriculture.

Points of interest

 Bajra Shahi Mosque, built in 1741–42, is the area's most important historical monument and is on the government Department of Archaeology's list of protected sites. Rectangular in plan, it has three domes, the middle one larger than those on either side, and octagonal towers at the four corners. Decorated between 1911 and 1928, it is covered in mosaics made from colored shards of ceramic.
 Joyag: During Mahatma Gandh's visit to some parts of Noakhali in January 1947, Hemanta Kumar Ghosh, a local zamindar, donated his property for setting up the Ambika-Kaliganga Charitable Trust, which later on became famous as Gandhi Ashram. Every morning and evening, people gather for a prayer meeting in a room which still contains mementos of Gandhi's visit here in January 1947.

Administration
Sonaimuri Upazila is divided into Sonaimuri Municipality and ten union parishads: Ambarnagr, Amishapara, Bajra, Barogaon, Chashirhat, Deoti, Joyag, Nateshwar, Nodona, and Sonapur. The union parishads are subdivided into 133 mauzas and 148 villages.

Sonaimuri Municipality is subdivided into 9 wards and 18 mahallas.

Chairmen

Education
Sonaimuri Govt. High School is the most renowned academic institution of this upazila. It played an important role in spreading education among all strata of the society from British days. Students of this school in the past played a pioneering role in our liberation struggle. Other important schools including Amishapara M.k High School, Sonapur Ali Akber High school, Rashidpur High School, Mahbubennesa Girls' High School, Bajra High School, Kalikapur High School, Rubirhat Banghabondhu High School, Nandia Para High School, Vir Srasto Ruhul Amin Academy, Jaiag High School, Nodona High School, Sonaimuri Girls School and Sonaimuri Hamedia alia (kamil) Madrassah. Sonaimuri College, Abirpara High School etc. are playing a very important role in promoting higher education in this upazila.

Notable residents
Kamrul Ahsan, Bangladesh Ambassador to Russia, Secretary to the Government and former Bangladesh High Commissioner to Canada and Singapore.
Bir Sreshtho Mohammad Ruhul Amin, engine room artificer in the Bangladesh Navy
M. A. Hashem, politician
Ahmad Nazir, journalist, writer, former Member of Parliament member and Director-General of Shilpakala Academy

References

Sonaimuri Upazila